Ralph Miller (1919–2001) was American basketball coach.

Ralph Miller is also the name of:

Ralph Miller (alpine skier) (1933–2021), American Olympic skier
Ralph Miller (right-handed pitcher) (1873–1973), 19th century baseball player
Ralph Miller (third baseman) (1896–1939), Major League Baseball third baseman
Ralph Miller (left-handed pitcher) (1899–1967), Major League Baseball pitcher
Brad Miller (politician) (Ralph Bradley Miller, born 1953), U.S. Representative from North Carolina
Ralph Miller (footballer) (1941–2014), English football (soccer) player
Ralph Willett Miller (1762–1799), Royal Navy captain
Ralph Miller (American football) (born 1948), American football player
 Ralph Miller, inventor of the Miller cycle for internal combustion engines